La Misma Gran Señora (The Same Great Lady) is a compilation album by Regional Mexican singer Jenni Rivera, released by Fonovisa in the United States on December 11, 2012, just two days after the fatal plane crash that claimed her life along with six others.

La Misma Gran Señora reached number one on the Mexican Albums Chart and number one on the Billboard Top Latin Albums chart in the United States. It also reached number thirty-eight on the Billboard 200 in 2013 and 2014.

The album was said to be the best-selling Latin album of 2013. Since the album's release, it has been awarded one Billboard Music Award, three Latin Billboard Music Awards, and two Mexican Billboard Music Awards. In 2013 it won the Top Latin Album award at the 2013 Billboard Music Awards. It was also awarded Album of the Year at the 2013 Latin Billboard Music Awards and 2013 Mexican Billboard Music Awards. It also won Banda Album of the Year at the 2013 Mexican Billboard Music Awards. At the 2014 Latin Billboard Music Awards, it was awarded Regional Mexican Album of the Year and garnered a nomination for Album of the Year. By October 2013, La Misma Gran Señora had sold over 880,000 copies worldwide.

Background
On October 1, 2012, Rivera's publicist announced Rivera filed for divorce from her husband Esteban Loaiza due to "irreconcilable differences on behalf of both parties derived from private circumstances that occurred during the lapse of their two-year marriage." The lead single that gave the album its name states "Yo sin ti seguiré siendo la misma gran señora, tu sin mi, nada vales en el mundo desde ahora" which translates to, "Me without you, I am still the great lady, you without me, you are nothing in the world anymore".

Commercial performance

Album
In Mexico, La Misma Gran Señora peaked at number one on the Top 100 Mexico albums chart. It was certified double platinum and gold by Asociación Mexicana de Productores de Fonogramas y Videogramas (AMPROFON) for shipping 270,000 copies in the country. Meanwhile, in the United States, it also peaked at number one on the Billboard Top Latin Albums and Billboard Regional Mexican Albums charts. Released within two days of her death, sales for the album soared in the United States. The album sold 27,000 copies in its first week, becoming the highest Latin album  debut of 2012. It was certified double platinum (Latin field) by the Recording Industry Association of America (RIAA) for shipments of 200,000 copies. La Misma Gran Señora was the best-selling Latin and Regional Mexican album of 2013 in the United States.

Singles
"La Misma Gran Señora", the lead single that gave the album its name peaked at number nine on the Hot Latin Songs in the United States in 2012 and 2013. It also peaked at number six on the Latin Regional Mexican Airplay in the United States in 2012 and 2013.

Reception
David Jeffries of Allmusic gave the album a 4 of 5 stars and said "pick this Jenni Rivera collection over the others". At the 2013 Billboard Music Awards it was awarded Top Latin Album of the Year and Rivera was awarded Top Latin Artist of the Year. At the third Mexican Billboard Music Awards in 2013, it' received an award for Album of the Year and Banda Album of the Year. At the 2013 Latin Billboard Music Awards, it  was awarded Album of the Year and Regional Mexican Album of the Year. At the 2013 Mexican Oye! Awards, "La Misma Gran Señora" was nominated for Popular Song of the Year. It was nominated for Album of the Year at the 2014 Latin Billboard Music Awards and recognized for Regional Mexican Album of the Year.

Track listing

Credits and personnel
The following credits are from Allmusic:

Homero Aguilar Cabrera - Composer
Victor Cordero - Composer
Maria Felicitas Rojero De Gurrola - Composer
Alfonso García F. - Composer
Vicente Fernández - Composer
José Manuel Figueroa - Composer
Pepe Garza - Composer
Agustín Cejudo Moreno - Composer
Ramon Ortega - Composer
Gilberto Parra - Composer
Carlos Peña - Composer
Jenni Rivera - Composer, Primary Artist
Tomás Méndez Sosa - Composer
Alberto Aguilera Valadez - Composer

Charts

Weekly charts

Year-end charts

Sales and certifications

See also
List of number-one Billboard Latin Albums from the 2010s

References

2012 compilation albums
Jenni Rivera compilation albums
Fonovisa Records compilation albums
2012 video albums
Jenni Rivera video albums
Fonovisa Records video albums
Music video compilation albums